A clan badge, sometimes called a plant badge, is a badge or emblem, usually a sprig of a specific plant, that is used to identify a member of a particular Scottish clan. They are usually worn affixed to the bonnet behind the Scottish crest badge, or pinned at the shoulder of a lady's tartan sash. According to popular lore clan badges were used by Scottish clans as a means of identification in battle. An authentic example of plants being used in this way (though not by a clan) were the sprigs of oats used by troops under the command of Montrose during the sack of Aberdeen. Similar items are known to have been used by military forces in Scotland, like paper, or the "White Cockade" (a bunch of white ribbon) of the Jacobites.

Authenticity
Despite popular lore, many clan badges attributed to Scottish clans would be completely impractical for use as a means of identification. Many would be unsuitable, even for a modern clan gathering, let alone a raging clan battle. Also, a number of the plants (and flowers) attributed as clan badges are only available during certain times of year. Even though it is maintained that clan badges were used long before the Scottish crest badges used today, according to a former Lord Lyon King of Arms the oldest symbols used at gatherings were heraldic flags such as the banner, standard and pinsel.

There is much confusion as to why some clans have been attributed more than one clan badge. Several 19th century writers variously attributed plants to clans, many times contradicting each other. It has been claimed by one writer that if a clan gained new lands it may have also acquired that district's "badge" and used it along with their own clan badge. It is clear however, that there are several large groups of clans which share badges and also share a historical connection. The Clan Donald group (clans Macdonald, Macdonald of Clanranald, Macdonell of Glengarry, MacDonald of Keppoch) and clans/septs which have been associated with Clan Donald (like certain MacIntyres and the Macqueens of Skye) all have common heath attributed as their badge. Another large group is the Clan Chattan group (clans Mackintosh, Macpherson, Macgillivray, Macqueen, Macbain, Farquharson, Davidson) which have been attributed red whortleberry (sometimes called cranberry in Scotland), or bearberry, or boxwood. The leaves of these three plants are very similar, and at least one writer has claimed that whatever plant which happened to be available was used. One group, the Siol Alpin group, of clans are said to have claimed or are thought to share a common descent. The Siol Alpin clans (clans Grant, Gregor, MacAulay, Macfie, Macnab, Mackinnon, Macquarrie) are all attributed the clan badge of pine (Scots fir). In some cases, clan badges are derived from the heraldry of clan chiefs. For example, the Farquharsons have pine attributed as a clan badge of theirs (pine also appears on the uniforms of the Invercauld Highlanders). Pine was actually used in the Invercauld Arms as a mark of cadencing to the basic Shaw-Mackintosh Arms.

Plants used as badges

See also
 Flora of Scotland
 Language of flowers
 Scottish crest badge

Notes and references

Bibliography

 
 
 
 
 
Moncreiffe of that Ilk, Iain. The Highland Clans. London: Barrie & Rockliff, 1967.
 

 badge
Symbols